Malappuram Lok Sabha constituency is one of the 20 Lok Sabha (parliamentary) constituencies in Kerala state in southern India. It is one amongst the 1st Lok Sabha parliament constituencies of India.

Assembly segments

Malappuram Lok Sabha constituency is composed of the following assembly segments:

Members of Parliament

As Malappuram (Malabar District)

As Manjeri

As Malappuram 

* indicates by polls

Election results

Bye-election 2021
Malappuram Lok Sabha Constituency went for bypoll on 6 April 2021 along with the 2021 Kerala Legislative Assembly Election. On May 2, the results were announced along with the results of the Legislative Assembly Elections. Former Rajya Sabha MP Abdussamad Samadani won the election by a margin of 1,14,615 votes.

General election 2019
According to Election Commission, there are 13,40,547 registered voters in Malappuram Constituency for 2019 Lok Sabha Election.

Legislative Assembly Constituency wise Results 2019

Bye-election 2017

General election 2014

General election 2009

See also
 Malappuram district
 Manjeri (Lok Sabha constituency)
 2019 Indian general election in Kerala

External links
 Loksabha constituencies
 Malappuram Lok Sabha constituency bye election 2017 results

References

Lok Sabha constituencies in Kerala
Politics of Malappuram district